José Luis Prado Medel (born 12 November 1956) is a Mexican former butterfly, freestyle and medley swimmer who competed in the 1972 Summer Olympics and in the 1976 Summer Olympics.

References

1956 births
Living people
Mexican male butterfly swimmers
Mexican male freestyle swimmers
Mexican male medley swimmers
Olympic swimmers of Mexico
Swimmers at the 1972 Summer Olympics
Swimmers at the 1976 Summer Olympics
Pan American Games competitors for Mexico
Swimmers at the 1971 Pan American Games
Central American and Caribbean Games gold medalists for Mexico
Competitors at the 1974 Central American and Caribbean Games
Central American and Caribbean Games medalists in swimming
20th-century Mexican people
21st-century Mexican people